Mary Moore may refer to:

 Mary Moore (author) (1930–2017), British author, diplomat and administrator
 Mary Moore (infielder) (born 1932), All-American Girls Professional Baseball League player
 Mary Moore (mayor) (born 1957), first woman elected as Mayor of Pearsall, Texas, (2015)
 Mary Moore (pitcher) (1942–1986), All-American Girls Professional Baseball League player
 Mary Moore (sculptor) (1887–1967), American sculptor and teacher
 Mary Moore (stage actress) (1861–1931), English born actress, second wife of Sir Charles Wyndham
 Mary Moore (voice actor), first national voice of the Bell System's standardized speaking clock
 Mary Moore, daughter of sculptor Henry Moore
 Mary Carr Moore (1873–1957), American composer
 Mary Elsie Moore (1889–1941), American heiress
 Mary Tyler Moore (1936–2017), American actress
 Mary Moore (Civil War nurse), Union nurse during the American Civil War
 Mary Moore (politician) (born 1948), member of the Alabama House of Representatives 
 Mary Elizabeth Moore, educator, writer, and dean of the Boston University School of Theology
 Mary Emelia Moore (1869–1951), New Zealand Presbyterian missionary in China
 Mary Moore (artist) (born 1957), Western Australian artist
 Mary Moore (silent film actress) (1890–1919) Irish-born silent film actress; sister of Owen, Matt and Tom Moore